Munsey may refer to:

People
Bret Munsey, American football coach
Frank Munsey, American publisher
George Munsey (born 1993), Scottish cricketer
Nelson Munsey, American football player
Stan E. Munsey, American songwriter/keyboardist
Steve Munsey, American pastor

Other uses
Munsey's Magazine
Munsey Park, New York, a village in Nassau County
Munsey Trust Building, Washington DC

See also
Muncie (disambiguation)
Muncey, surname
Muncy (disambiguation)
Munsee (disambiguation)
Mansi (disambiguation)
Minsi (disambiguation)